Route 325 is a collector road in the Canadian province of Nova Scotia. It is located in Lunenburg County and connects Colpton at Route 208 with Mahone Bay at Trunk 3.

The route originated as a post road between Halifax and Liverpool, dating from the latter part of the eighteenth century. In 1825, following the construction of a bridge across the Lahave River at present-day Bridgewater, the surveyor George Wightman recommended a change in the alignment between Mahone Bay and the new bridge. This shortened the route (now more or less equivalent to Route 332) that required a ferry crossing at LaHave. The new connection led to the growth of Bridgewater as the main commercial and transportation centre of Lunenburg County.

Communities
 Colpton
 West Clifford
 Bakers Settlement
 Newcombville
 Wileville
 Bridgewater
 Oak Hill
 Whynotts Settlement
 Maitland
 Blockhouse
 Mahone Bay

Parks
Cookville Provincial Park
Maitland Provincial Park

History

The  section of Collector Highway 325 between Bridgewater and Mahone Bay was once designated as Trunk Highway 3A. It served as a shortcut between the two communities, bypassing a  section of Trunk Highway 3; it was superseded in importance by Highway 103.

See also
List of Nova Scotia provincial highways

References

Map of Nova Scotia

325
325
Bridgewater, Nova Scotia